The men's 4 × 100 m Medley Relay event at the 2006 Central American and Caribbean Games occurred on Saturday, July 22, 2006 at the S.U. Pedro de Heredia Aquatic Complex in Cartagena, Colombia.

Only 8 relays were entered in the event, and consequently, it was only swum once (in finals).

Records at the time of the event were:
World Record: 3:30.68,  USA (Peirsol, Hansen, Crocker, Lezak), Athens, Greece, August 21, 2004.
Games Record: 3:44.61,  Cuba (Falcón, González, Garcia, Hernandez), 1998 Games in Maracaibo (Aug.14.1998).

Results

References

2006 CAC results: Men's 4x100 Medley Relay from the website of the 2006 Central American and Caribbean Games; retrieved 2009-07-02.

Medley Relay, Men's 4x100m